Jari Olavi Litmanen (born 20 February 1971) is a Finnish former footballer. He was the first-choice captain of the Finland national team between 1996 and 2008 in an international career that ran from 1989 to 2010.

Litmanen is widely considered to be Finland's greatest football player of all time. He was chosen as the best Finnish player of the last 50 years by the Football Association of Finland in the UEFA Jubilee Awards in November 2003. He also finished 42nd in the 100 Greatest Finns voting in 2004. The Association of Football Statisticians' (The AFS) compendium of 'Greatest Ever Footballers' listed Litmanen as the 53rd best footballer ever.

In Finland, he is often called "Litti" (after his own surname), which dates from his early years, and is also known as "Kuningas" ("The King").

During his club career, Litmanen represented Reipas, HJK, MyPa and Lahti in Finland, and Ajax, Barcelona, Liverpool, Hansa Rostock and Malmö FF abroad. Once considered one of the best attacking midfielders in the world, he became the first Finnish footballing superstar while playing for Ajax in the mid-1990s, winning the Champions League in 1995, the peak year of his career.

His later career was marred by injuries, and he was unable to repeat the success of his Ajax years either at Barcelona or Liverpool, often finding himself on the bench, despite some impressive performances for the latter. Writing about Litmanen in 2009, Paul Simpson, former FourFourTwo editor, went as far as to assert that "his career has not been worthy of his talent".

Club career

Early career in Finland
Litmanen made his first-team debut for Reipas in Finland's then top division Mestaruussarja at the age of 16 in 1987. After four seasons with Reipas he moved to HJK, Finland's biggest club, in 1991. A year later, he joined MyPa, where he was coached by Harri Kampman, who later introduced him to his agent, the late Heikki Marttinen. Litmanen did not win any medals in the Finnish league, but he did win the Finnish Cup with MyPa in July 1992 in a 2–0 win over FF Jaro in the final at the Helsinki Olympic Stadium. His performance in the cup final, including a goal, convinced a scout of Ajax that the club should sign him. "For me, he was the player," the scout later told Finnish television. His transfer took place during the same summer, and he did not complete the Finnish football season with MyPa.

Ajax

Before his move to Ajax, Litmanen had failed to earn a contract with the Romanian club Dinamo București. A number of European clubs, including Barcelona, Leeds United and PSV, had shown an interest in him, but in the end it was Ajax that bought him.

David Endt, who was the Ajax team manager in the 1990s, described his first impression of Litmanen to the Finnish broadcasting corporation YLE in 2010:

During 1992–93, his first season at Ajax, he played mostly in the reserves. The Ajax manager Louis van Gaal was apparently not overly impressed with him, but the team physiotherapist suggested using him as a stand-in for Dennis Bergkamp, who was injured at the time. Van Gaal liked what he saw, and knowing that Bergkamp was about to leave for Internazionale, he announced that Litmanen would be Bergkamp's successor, something that people in Litmanen's native Finland found difficult to believe. This turned out to be true, however, and he inherited from Bergkamp the famous number 10 shirt, which is often given to playmakers. He went on to score 26 goals in the 1993–94 season, becoming the league's top scorer, and leading Ajax to the title. He was also voted Footballer of the Year in the Netherlands in 1993.

Litmanen was one of the star players of Van Gaal's team that won three consecutive Dutch championships and reached the UEFA Champions League final twice in a row. From the beginning of the 1994–95 season to the middle of the 1995–96 season, Ajax went undefeated in both the Eredivisie (a run of 52 games) and the Champions League (19 games). When Ajax beat Milan in the 1995 Champions League final, Litmanen became the first Finnish player to win the European Cup/Champions League. In 1995–96, he was the Champions League top scorer with nine goals, including the equaliser in the final against Juventus, which Ajax lost on penalties. In 1995, he also won the Intercontinental Cup against Grêmio and came third in the voting for the Ballon d'Or (European Footballer of the Year), having finished eighth the previous year.

Litmanen spent seven years in Amsterdam, winning four Dutch championships and three KNVB Cups, and scored a total of 129 goals, 91 of them in the league. He is the club's top scorer in European competition with 26 goals in 54 matches (including two goals scored in the 2002–03 season). Litmanen has the honour of being one of just three players presented in a special video featurette at the Ajax Museum. The other two are Marco van Basten and Johan Cruyff. Frank Rijkaard, Litmanen's teammate in the 1993–94 and 1994–95 seasons, once said, "Dennis Bergkamp was brilliant for Ajax but the best No.10 we ever had was Jari." In his time at Ajax, some fans called him "Merlin" because of the magic he brought to the pitch.

But his proneness to injury also earned Litmanen the name "The Man of Glass", and injuries hampered his later seasons at Ajax causing him to miss many games (in his six seasons as a regular first-team player, he missed 57 out of a total of 204 league games, and in his last three seasons, he missed seven out of 24 European matches, playing only part of five others). His injury problems were to worsen as time passed, undermining his subsequent career.

Barcelona
In 1999, Litmanen was reunited with Louis van Gaal at Barcelona, one of several former Ajax players recruited by Van Gaal in his time as manager. Litmanen's stint with the club was largely plagued by injuries. An article in The Observer in April 2000 likened him to Pope John Paul II, in that he was "making few appearances and looking more frail each time".

Litmanen also failed to adapt to his new conditions, and he was one of the players dropped by Van Gaal that winter. Van Gaal later expressed his disappointment with Litmanen at Barcelona:

After an unsuccessful season, Van Gaal was replaced by Lorenzo Serra Ferrer, and Litmanen was frozen out of the team, losing the number 10 shirt to Rivaldo, although he remained at the club until January 2001, when he moved to Liverpool on a free transfer.

Liverpool
"We have signed a world-class player. He comes with a massive reputation and I believe he's one of the most exciting signings we have made," said Liverpool manager Gérard Houllier after the transfer had been completed. Litmanen also expressed his pleasure with the move: "It has always been my dream to play for Liverpool. I have supported them since I was a child and there has been talk about me joining them before." He wanted to wear the number seven shirt as worn by his boyhood hero Kenny Dalglish, but this had already been taken by Vladimír Šmicer. As shirt numbers 17 and 27 were also in use, he settled for the number 37.

Litmanen made a good start at Liverpool but broke his wrist playing for Finland against England at Anfield in late March 2001 and missed the rest of the season. Although he was part of the Liverpool team that won the treble of the League Cup, FA Cup and UEFA Cup in 2001, he missed all three finals because of injury. The following season, he was used sparingly by Houllier but did score goals against Tottenham Hotspur, Arsenal, Aston Villa and Fulham in the Premier League and against Dynamo Kyiv, Roma and Bayer Leverkusen in the Champions League.

According to his profile on LFCHistory.net, "Litmanen had difficulties in training due to his ankle problems and was hardly able to play for ninety minutes week in and week out." Litmanen himself was frustrated by his lack of playing time at Liverpool:

Litmanen was again given permission to move clubs for free after the 2001–02 season, having scored a total of 9 goals in 43 official matches during his one and a half seasons at the club.

Return to Ajax
Litmanen decided to return to Ajax, and was given a hero's welcome with the crowd again singing his name. He was one of the key players as Ajax reached the quarter-finals of the 2002–03 Champions League, but he continued to be plagued by injuries, and much of the following season was once again spent on the sidelines. In the spring of 2004, the club released him from his contract.

Lahti and Hansa Rostock
Litmanen's return to Finland, where he joined Lahti, was much hyped and was hailed as "the return of the king". Litmanen, however, moved to German Bundesliga strugglers Hansa Rostock in January 2005, but he was unable to prevent them being relegated, which ended his stint at the club.

Malmö FF
Litmanen joined the Swedish club Malmö FF in July 2005 in an attempt to help them qualify for the Champions League. This attempt, however, failed, and Litmanen himself was injured during the whole of the autumn, only making a few appearances. He decided to continue his career with Malmö in 2006 but was again sidelined with a number of injuries for much of the season. However, the matches he did play showed he remained a brilliant player when fit. After an operation to repair a damaged ankle during the winter break, Malmö decided to extend his contract over the 2007 season, but an ankle injury suffered in June 2007 forced Litmanen to cancel it.

Fulham
In January 2008, Litmanen received a ten-day trial invitation from Fulham under former Finland manager Roy Hodgson, and was signed on 31 January 2008 together with fellow countryman Toni Kallio. Just weeks after signing with Fulham, Litmanen had to return to his native Finland to rest, after serious heart concerns.

Litmanen eventually made his debut for Fulham in a reserve-team match against Tottenham on 31 March 2008, but he was released in May of the same year without playing a single game for the first team.

Return to Lahti
On 8 August 2008, it was announced that Litmanen would join his former club Lahti of the Finnish Premier Division for the remainder of the 2008 season. Although he only played 34 minutes in his first match, he scored twice and provided the passes for two other goals. He played an important role in helping Lahti to finish third in the league and qualify for Europe for the first time in the club's history. He signed a new one-year contract with Lahti on 16 April 2009. Litmanen scored his first European goal for Lahti in a 2–0 win against Gorica in the second qualifying round of the Europa League, with the final aggregate score being 2–1. This was his 30th goal in 83 European matches. On 18 September 2010, he scored a bicycle kick goal against Oulu in a 2–1 away victory.

On 23 October 2010, he scored his 50th Veikkausliiga goal, but this happened in a 3–2 defeat against TPS and didn't stop the club from being relegated to Ykkönen.

Return to HJK
On 20 April 2011, Litmanen signed a one-year contract with the reigning Finnish champions HJK at age 40, making him one of the few footballers to play at professional level in four different decades (1980s–2010s). He usually started as a substitute and played for 10–30 minutes. The HJK coach Antti Muurinen described Litmanen as something akin to a "precision munition" for HJK. He played in this role on 24 September 2011 in the Finnish Cup final against KuPS, coming on in the 80th minute when the score was 0–0. During the second half of extra time, he scored a spectacular half volley to make it 1–0 to HJK in the 108th minute. They went on to win the match 2–1. This was Litmanen's first Finnish Cup final after winning it with MyPa in 1992. 

On 2 October 2011, HJK secured their third consecutive Finnish championship, thus winning the Double. As of that day, Litmanen had played 18 matches for HJK that season, and they had won every single match in which he had been on the field. On 14 October 2011, this run ended when HJK drew 0–0 with JJK Jyväskylä.

On 29 October 2011, Litmanen celebrated his 200th league match by giving three assists in HJK's 5–2 home win over Haka. It was also his last game of the season and would prove to be the last of his professional career.

International career

Litmanen is Finland's most capped player and was Finland's leading goalscorer until 12 October 2021, when Teemu Pukki broke the record with two goals against Kazakhstan in a World Cup qualifier. His international career ran for 21 years from 1989 to 2010.

Litmanen made his Finland debut on 22 October 1989 against Trinidad and Tobago, and scored his first goal on 16 May 1991 against Malta. Litmanen served as Finland's captain from 1996 to 2008, and was arguably their key player for more than a decade, helping the team to many unexpected victories against higher ranked opposition.

Litmanen earned his 100th cap on 25 January 2006 against South Korea, one of only four Finns to have reached such a milestone, the others being Ari Hjelm, Sami Hyypiä and Jonatan Johansson.

When he played for Finland against South Korea on 19 January 2010, Litmanen became one of a handful of male players to represent a national team in four different decades, a feat matched by Andorra's Ildefons Lima in June 2021.

On 17 November 2010, Litmanen became the oldest player ever to score for Finland – and also the oldest player overall to score a goal in the qualifying stages for the UEFA European Championship – when he netted a penalty in an 8–0 win over San Marino, which proved to be his last international match.

Later career

In February 2011, the sports news programme Urheiluruutu of the Finnish Broadcasting Company YLE interviewed two of Litmanen's former teammates about the possibility of his working for Ajax when he decides to end his playing career. Former Ajax captain Danny Blind said the following:
Michel Kreek of the Ajax Academy was equally positive about this possibility: 

He served as a TV pundit for YLE during Euro 1992, Euro 2012, World Cup 2014 and Euro 2016, and, during the latter, also wrote comment and analysis for the newspaper Ilta-Sanomat.

Jari Litmanen has confirmed in his autobiography that his professional career is over. He played his last professional game in 2011.

Personal life
Litmanen was born into a footballing family. His father, Olavi Litmanen, was also a Finnish international and a Reipas player. His mother also played for Reipas at the women's highest level.

Litmanen became a father in November 2005 when his Estonian girlfriend Ly Jürgenson gave birth to a son named Caro. The couple's second son, Bruno, was born in September 2007. Although they avoid too much publicity, they are sometimes seen together in public.

On 10 October 2010, Litmanen became the first Finnish team sport player to be honoured with a statue: it stands at Kisapuisto (Lahti) where he started his career in the 1970s. The King – Jari Litmanen is a 2012 documentary film about Litmanen's career.

On 11 May 2020, Litmanen said to Unibet that his coronavirus test was positive, and he had been recovering for four weeks. He said of this time that "I've probably never been in such bad shape".

Career statistics

Club

Finnish League Cup held for the first time in 1994.

International goals

Honours
MyPa
Finnish Cup: 1992

Ajax
Eredivisie: 1993–94, 1994–95, 1995–96, 1997–98, 2003–04
KNVB Cup: 1992–93, 1997–98, 1998–99
Dutch Supercup: 1993, 1994, 1995
UEFA Champions League: 1994–95
UEFA Super Cup: 1995
Intercontinental Cup: 1995

Liverpool
FA Cup: 2000–01
Football League Cup: 2000–01
FA Community Shield: 2001
UEFA Cup: 2000–01
UEFA Super Cup: 2001

HJK
Veikkausliiga: 2011
Finnish Cup: 2011

Finland
Nordic Football Championship: 2000–01

Individual
Finnish Sports Journalists Player of the Year (8): 1990, 1992, 1993, 1994, 1995, 1996, 1997, 1998
Finnish Football Association Player of the Year (9): 1990, 1992, 1993, 1994, 1995, 1996, 1997, 1998, 2000
 Veikkausliiga Player of the Year: 1990
Dutch Footballer of the Year: 1993
Dutch league top scorer: 1993–94 (26 goals)
UNICEF European Footballer of the Season: 1994–95
Ballon d'Or: 1994 (8th), 1995 (3rd)
Finnish Sports Personality of the Year: 1995
 ESM Team of the Year: 1994–95, 1995–96
UEFA Champions League top scorer: 1995–96 (9 goals)
Captain's Ball: 2002
UEFA Jubilee Awards – Greatest Finnish Footballer of the last 50 Years: 2003
Most-capped player for the Finland national team: 137 caps
2nd all-time top scorer for the Finland national team: 32 goals
All-time top scorer in Europe for Ajax: 26 goals
Oldest Player to Score in UEFA European Championship qualifying: 39 years and 270 days
FC Lahti Hall of Fame: 2016

See also 
 List of men's footballers with 100 or more international caps

References

External links

 Profile at FA of Finland's official website 
 Big article, photos and interview with Jari Litmanen 
 Kuningas Litmanen documentary – English at [Escape To Suomi]
 Article at Helsingin Sanomat

1971 births
Living people
Sportspeople from Lahti
Finnish footballers
Association football midfielders
Association football forwards
Reipas Lahti players
Helsingin Jalkapalloklubi players
Myllykosken Pallo −47 players
AFC Ajax players
FC Barcelona players
Liverpool F.C. players
FC Lahti players
FC Hansa Rostock players
Malmö FF players
Fulham F.C. players
Mestaruussarja players
Veikkausliiga players
Eredivisie players
La Liga players
Premier League players
Bundesliga players
Allsvenskan players
UEFA Champions League winning players
UEFA Cup winning players
UEFA Champions League top scorers
Finland international footballers
FIFA Century Club
UEFA Golden Players
Finnish expatriate footballers
Finnish expatriate sportspeople in the Netherlands
Finnish expatriate sportspeople in Spain
Finnish expatriate sportspeople in England
Finnish expatriate sportspeople in Germany
Finnish expatriate sportspeople in Sweden
Expatriate footballers in the Netherlands
Expatriate footballers in Spain
Expatriate footballers in England
Expatriate footballers in Germany
Expatriate footballers in Sweden